Kim Byung-Hee (born 9 March 1982) is a South Korean female sport shooter. She competed in shooting at the 2010 Asian Games, winning a gold medal in the women's 10 metre air pistol. She went on to compete in the women's 10 metre air pistol at the 2012 Summer Olympics.

References

1982 births
Living people
Asian Games medalists in shooting
Olympic shooters of South Korea
Shooters at the 2012 Summer Olympics
South Korean female sport shooters
Shooters at the 2006 Asian Games
Shooters at the 2010 Asian Games
Asian Games gold medalists for South Korea
Asian Games bronze medalists for South Korea
Medalists at the 2006 Asian Games
Medalists at the 2010 Asian Games
Sportspeople from South Jeolla Province
20th-century South Korean women
21st-century South Korean women